Carlton House may refer to:

in Australia
 Carlton House, Toowoomba in Queensland

in Canada
Fort Carlton, near Saskatoon, Saskatchewan, Canada, formerly known as Carlton House

in England
Carlton House, London
Carlton House, Manchester
Carlton House, Plympton

in the United States
Carlton House (Lake Village, Arkansas), listed on the National Register of Historic Places (NRHP)
Carlton House (United States Air Force Academy), NRHP-listed
Albert Carlton Estate, Wauchula, Florida, NRHP-listed
Jonathan Carlton House, Petersburg, Kentucky, listed on the NRHP in Kentucky
Carlton-Frie-Tucker House, North Andover, Massachusetts, NRHP-listed
Carlton House Block, Springfield, Massachusetts, NRHP-listed
Carlton-Gladden House, Paris, Texas, listed on the NRHP in Texas
Carlton (Falmouth, Virginia), listed on the NRHP in Virginia

Elsewhere
Carlton House, Jamaica, a place on the List of National Heritage Sites in Jamaica
Carlton House (horse), a thoroughbred racehorse owned by Queen Elizabeth II
Medamulana Walawwa, also referred to as the Carlton House, Tangalle, the residence of former Sri Lankan President Mahinda Rajapaksa